Storm King Mountain  may refer to several mountain peaks in the United States:

Storm King Mountain (Garfield County, Colorado), site of the 1994 South Canyon Fire
Storm King Mountain (Saguache County, Colorado)
Storm King Mountain (New York)
Storm King Mountain (Ferry County, Washington)
Storm King Mountain (Lewis County, Washington)